A94 or A-94 may refer to:

 A94 road (Great Britain), a major road in the United Kingdom
 A 94 motorway (Germany), a partially constructed regional highway in Bavaria
 Dutch Defence, in the Encyclopaedia of Chess Openings